Connor Leimer is a New York City–based singer-songwriter and multi-instrumentalist. Influenced by Jake Bugg, Jens Lekman and Van Morrison, among others, he released his debut album Postcard in the fall of 2015.

Leimer grew up in Leawood, Kansas, a suburb south of Kansas City. After attending a summer writing workshop, Leimer released the EP Like It's June.

In the fall of 2015, Leimer began a tour during which he performed at universities across the United States. Leimer booked the tour himself, beginning in Nashville with stops in New York City, Boston, Chicago and culminating in Kansas City.

The tour also included a solo performance and Q&A at the Grammy Museum at L.A. Live in the renowned Clive Davis Theater.

On May 18, 2018, Leimer independently released the single "Brooklyn", produced by Grammy Award-winning producer Matt Rollings and mixed by Michael Brauer at New York's Electric Lady Studios. The song was accompanied by a music video directed by Warren Elgort.

Discography
 2015 Postcard (album)

References

External links
 Official website
 Connor Leimer on YouTube
 Connor Leimer on Instagram
 Connor Leimer on Twitter
 Connor Leimer on Facebook

American male singer-songwriters
Musicians from Kansas City, Kansas
1996 births
Living people
21st-century American singers
21st-century American male singers
Singer-songwriters from Kansas